12 Bar Blues is the debut solo album from Stone Temple Pilots singer Scott Weiland. Its sound and style differ greatly from STP's previous releases. The design concept of the cover is a homage to the cover design of John Coltrane's Blue Train album. The title name comes from the simple chord progression known as "twelve-bar blues".

Development
In a 1998 interview on MTV's 120 Minutes, Weiland states that his then brother-in-law introduced him to Blair Lamb, who co-produced 12 Bar Blues with Weiland.

Reception

Released in 1998 on Atlantic Records, the album was not a commercial success, but achieved some critical acclaim. In a retrospective review, Stephen Thomas Erlewine of AllMusic gave the album 4 out of 5 stars, declaring "12 Bar Blues is an unpredictable, carnivalesque record confirming that Weiland was the visionary behind STP's sound. He's fascinated by sound, piling on layers of shredded guitars, drum loops, and keyboards, making sure that each song sounds drastically different from its predecessor." David Fricke of Rolling Stone awarded the album 3.5 out of 5 stars and declared that "12 Bar Blues isn't really a rock album, or even a pop album. Weiland, out on his own, has simply made an honest album – honest in its confusion, ambition and indulgence. It was worth the risk." but also remarked that "Maybe it's a little early for Scott Weiland to be going the solo way." Pitchfork Media stated upon its release that "12 Bar Blues is easily the most innovative album Weiland has ever produced for public consumption," while Entertainment Weekly wrote that "the LP's sheer invention and hooks will make your indulgence worthwhile."

Track listing
All Songs Written By Scott Weiland (Foxy Dead Girl Music).  Co-Writers in parenthesis.
"Desperation #5" – 4:05
"Barbarella" – 6:36 (Tony Castaneda)
"About Nothing" – 4:48 (Castaneda)
"Where's the Man" – 4:55
"Divider" – 4:23 (Victor Indrizzo; Famous Music Corp.)
"Cool Kiss" – 4:55
"The Date" – 5:21
"Son" – 5:04 (Indrizzo; Famous Music Corp.) (dedicated to "Zack")
"Jimmy Was a Stimulator" – 3:58
"Lady, Your Roof Brings Me Down" – 5:26 (Indrizzo; Famous Music Corp.)
"Mockingbird Girl" – 5:02 (Jeff Nolan, Zander Schloss; UA Music Inc., Floated Music, EMI Virgin Music; "Its The Mega", United Lion Music, Sho Me Mo)
"Opposite Octave Reaction" – 4:18

Track information
An additional track entitled "Lazy Divey" was recorded for the album, and was included on some early promotional copies of the album.  Its chorus is identical to, and its name is taken from, the chorus of 1943's "Mairzy Doats".
"Mockingbird Girl" was a re-recording of a song Weiland had originally recorded with The Magnificent Bastards for the 1995 Tank Girl soundtrack three years prior.

Personnel
 Scott Weiland – lead vocals, beatbox, guitar, keyboards, piano, bass, synthesized bass, drum loops
 Tracy Chisolm – theremin
 Blair Lamb – beatbox
 Holly Reiger – guitars
 Jeff Nolan, Zander Schloss – guitars
 Sheryl Crow – accordion
 Brad Mehldau – piano
 Peter DiStefano – guitars, bass
 Victor Indrizzo – vocals, guitar, piano, keyboards, bass, drums
 Daniel Lanois – synthesizers, production
 Tony Castaneda – guitars, bass
 Martyn LeNoble – bass, cello
 Michael Weiland – drums, percussion, drum loops
 Suzie Katayama – cello
 Novi Novog – viola
 Joel Derouin, Robin Lorentz – violin

Production
 Produced by Blair Lamb, Tracy Chisholm, Scott Weiland & Daniel Lanois
 Recording and engineers: Chad Banford, Chris Goss, Tracy Chisolm
 Additional engineers: Daniel Lanois, Jason Gladden, Tracy Chisolm, David Nottingham, Eric Greedy, Jeff Robinson, John Sorensen, Rafa Sardina, Reid Miller
 Mixing: Mark Howard, Daniel Lanois, Tracy Chisolm
 Mastering: Daniel Lanois, Mark Chalecki

Chart performance

Additionally, "Barbarella" peaked at 194 on the UK Singles Chart

References

1998 debut albums
Scott Weiland albums
Albums produced by Daniel Lanois
Atlantic Records albums